Remetinec is a village near Novi Marof in Varaždin County, Croatia, population 1,477 (2011).

References

Populated places in Varaždin County